Theys is a commune in the Isère department in southeastern France. It is one of the three communes of Les sept Laux winter sports resort.

Population

See also
Communes of the Isère department

References

External links

Communes of Isère
Isère communes articles needing translation from French Wikipedia